Pea Island National Wildlife Refuge is a national wildlife refuge located on North Carolina's Pea Island, a coastal barrier island and part of a chain of islands known as the Outer Banks, adjacent to Cape Hatteras National Seashore.

The refuge's objectives are to provide nesting, resting, and wintering habitat for migratory birds, including the greater snow geese and other migratory waterfowl, shorebirds, wading birds, raptors, and neotropical migrants, as well as habitat and protection for endangered and threatened species. Objectives also include providing opportunities for public enjoyment of wildlife and wildlands resources. Public use programs focus on interpretation, environmental education, wildlife observation, wildlife photography, and fishing.

Refuge facts

The refuge was established May 17, 1937. It includes 5,834 acres (23.6 km2) of land and 25,700 acres (104 km2) Proclamation Boundary Waters.

The refuge is administered by the Alligator River National Wildlife Refuge as a part of a refuge complex; the manager of the Alligator River refuge supervises the managers of the Mackay Island, Currituck, and Pocosin Lakes National Wildlife Refuges. The Comprehensive Conservation Management Plan for the refuge was completed in September 2006. A 36-person staff administers both Pea Island and Alligator River National Wildlife Refuges, with a budget of $2,827K (FY 03) for both refuges. Numerous volunteers devote approximately 35,000 hours each year to the refuge.

There are 2.7 million visitors annually. Pea Island National Wildlife Refuge is known as a "birder's paradise"; birders make up some of the many visitors. Other eco-tourists include canoeists and kayakers, beachcombers, surf and sound anglers, and nature photographers.

Natural history

The refuge contains ocean beach, dunes, upland, fresh and brackish water ponds, salt flats, and salt marsh. There are more than 365 species of birds, 25 species of mammals, 24 species of reptiles, and 5 species of amphibians. There are concentrations of ducks, geese, swans, wading birds, shorebirds, and raptors. There are neotropical migrants that are seasonally abundant on the refuge. The refuge has 1,000 acres (4 km2) of manageable waterfowl impoundments, and there are several shorebird nesting areas and wading bird rookeries are located in the refuge.

Endangered and threatened species include shortnose sturgeon, red wolf, loggerhead sea turtles, green sea turtle, leatherback sea turtle, hawksbill sea turtle, Kemp's ridley sea turtle, red-cockaded woodpecker, roseate tern, West Indian manatee, seabeach amaranth, and piping plovers.

The refuge area was historically used for market waterfowl hunting, commercial fishing, farming, and livestock operations.

Climate

According to the Trewartha climate classification system, Pea Island National Wildlife Refuge, North Carolina has a humid subtropical climate with hot and humid summers, cool winters and year-around precipitation (Cfak). Cfak climates are characterized by all months having an average mean temperature > 32.0 °F (> 0.0 °C), at least eight months with an average mean temperature ≥ 50.0 °F (≥ 10.0 °C), at least one month with an average mean temperature ≥ 71.6 °F (≥ 22.0 °C) and no significant precipitation difference between seasons. During the summer months in Pea Island National Wildlife Refuge, a cooling afternoon sea breeze is present on most days, but episodes of extreme heat and humidity can occur with heat index values ≥ 100 °F (≥ 38 °C). Pea Island National Wildlife Refuge is prone to hurricane strikes, particularly during the Atlantic hurricane season which extends from June 1 through November 30, sharply peaking from late August through September. During the winter months, episodes of cold and wind can occur with wind chill values < 10 °F (< -12 °C). The plant hardiness zone at Pea Island National Wildlife Refuge is 8b with an average annual extreme minimum air temperature of 16.5 °F (-8.6 °C). The average seasonal (Dec-Mar) snowfall total is < 2 inches (< 5 cm), and the average annual peak in nor'easter activity is in February.

Ecology

According to the A. W. Kuchler U.S. potential natural vegetation types, Pea Island National Wildlife Refuge, North Carolina would have a dominant vegetation type of live oak/sea oats (Uniola paniculata) (90) with a dominant vegetation form of coastal prairie (20).

See also
 Pea Island Life-Saving Station

References

Further reading 
 Pea Island fact sheet (.pdf)
 Pea Island National Wildlife Refuge Comprehensive Conservation Plan.  September 2006.

External links
 Pea Island National Wildlife Refuge official site
 Alligator River Refuge official site

Protected areas of Dare County, North Carolina
National Wildlife Refuges in North Carolina
Outer Banks
Protected areas established in 1938
1938 establishments in North Carolina
Wetlands of North Carolina
Landforms of Dare County, North Carolina